Konstantin Valeryevich Chernyshov (born June 11, 1967) is a Russian chess grandmaster (2000).

In 2008 he tied for 1st–8th with Vugar Gashimov, David Arutinian, Yuriy Kryvoruchko, Sergey Fedorchuk, Andrei Deviatkin, Vasilios Kotronias and Erwin L'Ami in the Cappelle-la-Grande Open Tournament. In 2010 he tied for 1st–4th with Evgeny Bareev, Lê Quang Liêm and Ernesto Inarkiev in the Moscow Open and won the event on tie-break.

References

External links 

1967 births
Living people
Chess grandmasters
Russian chess players